Benjamin Sherman may refer to:

 Benjamin Sherman (Wisconsin politician) (1836–1915), member of the Wisconsin State Assembly and the Wisconsin State Senate
 Benjamin Sherman (Michigan politician) (1792–1872), member of the Michigan House of Representatives
 Benjamin Sherman (athlete) (1881–?), American athlete

See also
 Ben Sherman, a British clothing brand